Tonight Only! is a 1961 album by the Dave Brubeck Quartet featuring the singer Carmen McRae.

This was the first of three albums that Brubeck and McRae would make together, they would later work on Take Five Live (1961) and The Real Ambassadors (1962). Brubeck praised McRae's lyrical interpretations of his songs, later stating that "Carmen has added even to my own understanding of the music".

Brubeck's wife, Iola, contributed lyrics to three songs: "Weep No More", "Briar Bush" and "Strange Meadow Lark".

Reception

The Billboard magazine review from 5 June 1961 chose Tonight Only! as one of its 'Spotlight Winners of the Week' and commented, "Brubeck teams up with canary Carmen McRae on this package and the results are eminently tasteful and listenable".

The album was reviewed by Scott Yanow at Allmusic who wrote, "One of the more obscure Dave Brubeck albums is really a showcase for the young singer Carmen McRae who performs nine numbers ...McRae is in fine voice but strangely enough all of the songs (except for "Strange Meadowlark") have been long forgotten. Stronger material would have resulted in a more memorable session".

Track listing
 "Melanctha" - 9:58
 "Weep No More" (Dave Brubeck, Iola Brubeck) - 2:49 	
 "Talkin' and Walkin'" (Eugene Wright) - 4:24
 "Briar Bush" (D. Brubeck, I. Brubeck) - 2:58
 "Paradiddle Joe" (Johnny Morris, Fred Parries, Jerry Pugsley) - 2:00
 "Late Lament" (Paul Desmond) - 6:17
 "Strange Meadow Lark" (D. Brubeck, I. Brubeck) - 2:38
 "Tristesse" (D. Brubeck) - 4:58
 "Tonight Only" (D. Brubeck) - 7:27

Tracks 2, 4, 5, 7, with McRae, were recorded on September 9, 1960; tracks 1 and 8 were recorded December 14, and on the following day, December 15, tracks 3, 6 and 9. Track 8, "Tristesse", is a piano solo by Brubeck.

Personnel
The Dave Brubeck Quartet
Dave Brubeck - piano
Paul Desmond - alto saxophone
Gene Wright - double bass
Joe Morello - drums
with
Carmen McRae - vocals (2, 4, 5, 7)

Production
Teo Macero - producer, liner notes
Henry Parker - photography

References

1961 albums
Albums produced by Teo Macero
Columbia Records albums
Dave Brubeck albums
Carmen McRae albums